My Country, My Country is a 2006 documentary film about Iraq under U.S. occupation by the filmmaker Laura Poitras.

Film
Laura Poitras spent over eight months working on her own and for some time following a US Army Civil Affairs team during the elections in Iraq filming the documentary.  The film shows life in Iraq for average Iraqis under U.S. occupation. Poitras focuses primarily on Dr. Riyadh al-Adhadh, an Iraqi medical doctor, father of six and Sunni political candidate.

The film was well received by critics and was nominated for an Academy Award for Best Documentary Feature.

The film had a limited U.S. theatrical release. The PBS program P.O.V. broadcast the film in October 2006.

After completing the film, Poitras claims "Since completing My Country, My Country, I've been placed on the Department of Homeland Security's (DHS) watch list" and to have been notified by airport security "that my 'threat rating' was the highest the Department of Homeland Security assigns".  The film is one of three in a series, with the second being The Oath (2010). The third, Citizenfour (2014), focuses on the NSA's domestic surveillance programs. She is suing the U.S. government over her 40 detentions by US officials.

Reception

Critical response
My Country, My Country has an approval rating of 86% on review aggregator website Rotten Tomatoes, based on 36 reviews, and an average rating of 7.09/10. The website's critical consensus states, "This war documentary offers a valuable look at Iraqi life under the U.S. occupation, and finds a compelling central subject in Dr. Riyadh". Metacritic assigned the film a weighted average score of 74 out of 100, based on 18 critics, indicating "generally favorable reviews".

See also
Axis of Evil
Baghdad or Bust
Control Room
Kill the Messenger
The Unreturned
War Feels Like War
The Oath
Citizenfour, a 2014 documentary film directed by Laura Poitras about Edward Snowden and the first major disclosure of the National Security Agency's global surveillance system and its use against US citizens.

References
POV 2006 TV Schedule (https://www.pbs.org/pov/mycountry/)

External links

Laura Poitras Featured Video Interview: The Alcove with Mark Molaro
Alternate Trailer site with the trailer.
EPIC Ground Truth Project: Interview with Director Laura Poitras
Joe M. O'Connell review in The Austin Chronicle
 
 Distributor's webpage.
 
 

2006 films
2006 documentary films
American documentary films
Documentary films about the Iraq War
American independent films
POV (TV series) films
Films directed by Laura Poitras
2000s English-language films
2000s American films